Microsoft Interface Definition Language (MIDL) is a text-based interface description language from Microsoft, based on the DCE/RPC IDL which it extends for use with the Microsoft Component Object Model. Its compiler is also called MIDL.

See also
 Object Description Language

External links
 Microsoft Docs reference

Microsoft development tools
Component-based software engineering
Microsoft application programming interfaces
Object-oriented programming
Object models